Xeloma leprosa is a species of scarab beetle belonging to the subfamily Cetoniinae. It is found in tropical regions of Africa including Namibia, Zimbabwe, Transvaal, Natal and Angola.

References

Beetles described in 1842
Cetoniinae
Taxa named by Hermann Burmeister